The New Improved Sun: An Anthology of Utopian S-F is an anthology of science fiction stories edited by American writer Thomas M. Disch, published in hardcover by Harper & Row in 1975. Second edition published by Hutchinson in 1976. Many of the stories are original to the volume.

Contents
 "Introduction: Buck Rogers in the New Jerusalem", Thomas M. Disch
 "Heavens Below: Fifteen Utopias", John Sladek (original)
 "Repairing the Office", Charles Naylor (original)
 "What You Get for Your Dollar", Brian W. Aldiss (from The Shape of Further Things, 1970)
 "The People of Prashad", James Keilty (Quark/2 1971)
 "A Few Things I Know About Whileaway", Joanna Russ (The Female Man 1975)
 "Drumble", Cassandra Nye (original)
 "A Clear Day in the Motor City", Eleanor Arnason (New Worlds 6 1973)
 "Settling the World", M. John Harrison (original)
 "Instead of the Cross, the Lollipop", B. F. Skinner (from Walden Two 1948)
 "I Always Do What Teddy Says," Harry Harrison (Ellery Queen's Mystery Magazine 1965)
 "Pyramids for Minnesota: A Serious Proposal", Thomas M. Disch (Harper's Magazine 1974)
 "The Zen Archer", Jonathan Greenblatt (original)
 "The Hero as Werwolf", Gene Wolfe (original)
 "The Change", H. G. Wells (from In the Days of the Comet, 1906)

Each of the vignettes in Sladek's "Fifteen Utopias" carries an individual subtitle. "Cassandra Nye" is a pseudonym of Charles Naylor.

Reception
In The New York Times, Gerald Jonas notes that while the anthology's contents contradicted its subtitle, being mostly satires and dystopias, "Disch knows exactly what he is doing: he points out in a brief introduction that prescriptive Utopias tend to be not only dull but also silly and repugnant."

References

Science fiction anthologies
Works by Thomas M. Disch
Harper & Row books
1975 anthologies